Chaetabraeus (Mazureus) paria, is a species of clown beetle found in Pakistan, East India, Sri Lanka, Thailand, Taiwan and Sumatra.

References

Histeridae
Insects of Sri Lanka
Insects described in 1856